Pietra means "stone" in Italian language. It is also rarely used as a given name (feminine of Pietro, Peter), corresponding at almost to Petra. It may refer to:

People
 Pietra Brettkelly (born 1965), New Zealand film director
 Pietra Montecorvino (born 1962), Italian singer and actress
 Pietra Rivoli (born 1950s), American economist
 Pietra (surname), an Italian surname

Other uses
 Pietra Brewery, a Corsican brewery
 La Pietra, a school in Honolulu, Hawaii

See also

Peter Pietras (1908–1993), American soccer player
Pietro, given name
Pietrari (disambiguation)
Petra, a city in Jordan
Petra (disambiguation)